The International Day of Women and Girls in Science is an annual observance adopted by the United Nations General Assembly to promote the full and equal access and participation of women in Science, Technology, Engineering and Mathematics (STEM) fields. The United Nations General Assembly passed resolution 70/212 on 22 December 2015, which proclaimed the 11th day of February as the annual commemoration of the observance. A theme is selected annually to highlight a particular focus and area of discussion around a focus point for gender equality in science.

The International Day of Women and Girls in Science is implemented annually by UNESCO in collaboration with UN Women. Both organisations work with national governments, intergovernmental organisations, civil society partners, universities and corporations in order to achieve the shared goal of promoting the role of women and girls in scientific fields and celebrate those already successful in the field.

Background

Context 

In comparison to their male peers, females are underrepresented in science and technology fields. Between the 1960s and 1980s, the number of women obtaining science and engineering degrees steadily increased in American universities, however reached an unexpected plateau from the 1980s. A 2013 UK study explored that there has existed a persistent underrepresentation of women in STEM fields, and that in the prior 25-year period there had been little change of the participation of women in science and technology. Further, social barriers including the expectation of women in the home, early marriage and discriminatory practices in the labour market have been persistent in preventing women in developing regions across the world such as Africa, South Asia and the Caribbean from not only pursuing science and technology further, but education more broadly.

In the present day these barriers to participation are still persistent, and present as social barriers. A 2013 study in the United Kingdom explored the social barriers to participation post the compulsory participation age in sciences (particularly physics) and determined that pervasive gender biases exist, with girls less likely to be encouraged to study physics by their teachers, family, and friends.

Throughout the world there are also regional differences in the particular barriers for female participation in the sciences. In the United States, it was found that lower enrolment and attraction to scientific education across the pipeline resulted in lower female participation. This differed to the Arab world, where enrolment in scientific education is particularly high, comprising a sixty to eighty percent share of total enrolments, however career and social barriers prevented further participation.

Adoption by the United Nations 

On 22 December 2015, the United Nations General Assembly met to adopt resolution 70/212 titled “International Day of Women and Girls in Science”. This resolution formally proclaimed February 11 as the annual observation of the International Day of Women and Girls in Science. The United Nations General Assembly invited all member states, organisations and bodies of the United Nations alongside individuals and the private sector to engage in awareness raising and educational activities to promote the full and equal access for women and girls in science. In adopting the resolution, the United Nations drew on several of its previous resolutions in order to cite the need for the observation of the International Day of Women and Girls in Science. Notably, resolution 70/1 titled “Transforming our world: the 2030 Agenda for Sustainable Development”, which declared the United Nations’ 2030 sustainable development goals, was cited, namely the goals of quality education and gender equality. Alongside this, resolution 68/220 was cited, where the United Nations General Assembly recognised that in order to achieve gender equality and female empowerment, it is essential to promote the full and equal access of females to participate in science, technology and innovation. The two key United Nations organisations responsible for the International Day of Women and Girls in Science are  UNESCO and UN Women.

Annual commemorations and official themes 
Each year on February 11, the United Nations hosts the International Day of Women and Girls in Science Assembly. The assembly brings together both representatives of member states alongside representatives of international organisations, the private sector and leading scientists to discuss measures and initiatives to promote the increased participation of females in STEM. The Assembly is co-sponsored by the Permanent Missions to the United Nations of Andorra, Antigua and Barbuda, Armenia, Australia, Bhutan, Chile, Ecuador, Finland, Greece, Latvia, Mexico, Nigeria, Republic of Korea, San Marino, and Uzbekistan. Each year the assembly focuses upon a key theme as a central topic of discussion.

Recognition by government organisations 

Alongside the annual assembly of the United Nations, various governments and governmental organisations promote initiatives to recognise and endorse the International Day of Women and Girls in Science, including raising awareness and increasing funding to initiatives promoting women in science. Selected examples have been highlighted below.

Australia 
As a permanent sponsor mission, the Australian Government has actively taken steps to promote and encourage female participation in alignment with the recognition and celebration of the International Day of Women and Girls in Science. To commemorate the event in 2022, the Australian Government Department of Industry, Science, Energy and Resources committed A$6.7 million of funding to address female underrepresentation in STEM fields by expanding successful initiatives targeting the issue.

European Union 
The executive branch of the European Union, the European Commission, has specifically called upon its citizens to acknowledge the achievements of female participation in scientific research and innovation on the International Day of Women and Girls in Science. The European Union has actively implemented initiatives to promote women and girls in science, such as requiring organisations to have a Gender Equality Plan in place to be eligible to receive Horizon Europe funding and grants as well as awarding three EUR 50,000 grants in 2022 to female innovators under 35.

Ireland 
The Irish Government actively recognises the International Day of Women and Girls in Science and has used the commemoration to announce reforms to recognise and promote the need for increased female participation in STEM. On recognition of the 7th annual observation of the event, the Irish Minister for Further and Higher Education, Research, Innovation and Science, Simon Harris, announced that the three largest providers of scientific funding in Ireland require Higher Education institutions to have gender equality accreditation before they have access to research funding.

Kenya 
The Government of the Republic of Kenya, specifically the Ministry of Education and National Commission for Science, Technology and Innovation have actively celebrated the International Day of Women and Girls in Science. In 2022, the organisations alongside the UNESCO Kenya National Mission hosted a virtual celebration to celebrate the 2022 theme involving speakers and educational aspects.

United Kingdom 
The Government of the United Kingdom is an active supporter of the International Day of Women and Girls, and actively promotes it through its Government agencies. Notably, the United Kingdom’s Foreign, Commonwealth and Development Office actively promoted and stated the United Kingdom’s commitment to supporting women and girls in STEM through its social media channels for the 2022 commemoration and through interviews with leading British female scientists in 2021.

Other recognition 
Globally, non-government and corporate organisations have also recognised the International Day of Women and Girls in Science through their own initiatives to promote the role of females in STEM. Selected examples have been highlighted below.

Universities and academia 

Universities and academic organisations play a key role in the recognition of the International Day of Women and Girls in Science. For example, in 2017 for the 2nd annual commemoration of the event, the International Particle Physics Outreach Group, a network of academics and scientists from universities and research laboratories around the globe, launched masterclasses ran by female scientists for female students across Barcelona, Cagliari, Cosenza, Heidelberg, Madrid, Paris, Prague, Rio de Janeiro and Sao Paolo. After their launch these masterclasses have continued to run annually alongside the International Day of Women and Girls in Science. Associated members of the International Science Council including the International Astronomical Union, International Mathematical Union and International Union of Pure and Applied Chemistry all host events both in person and virtually on an annual basis to celebrate the International Day of Women and Girls in Science.

Corporations 
Various corporations actively participate in initiatives to promote women and girls in science that coincide with the commemoration of the International Day of Women and Girls in Science. L’Oreal sponsors the L’Oreal-UNESCO For Women in Science Awards which are presented annually on 11 February to five female scientists from regions across the globe to recognise esteemed accomplishment in scientific fields. Airbus, a global aviation company, utilises the focus of the International Day of Women and Girls in Science to highlight important women in their company and the key roles they play for the firm globally. In 2022, they highlighted the role of the first female to join Airbus' space programme manager's group in Madrid.

References

External links 

February observances
2015 in the United Nations
United Nations days
Women in science and technology